The 1964–65 Northern Football League season was the 68th in the history of Northern Football League, a football competition in England.

Clubs

Division One featured 16 clubs which competed in the league last season, along with two new clubs, joined from the North Eastern League:
 Blyth Spartans
 North Shields

League table

References

Northern Football League seasons
1964–65 in English football leagues